Robert Andrich (born 22 September 1994) is a German professional footballer who plays as a midfielder for Bundesliga club Bayer Leverkusen.

Career
In January 2018, it was announced Andrich would join 1. FC Heidenheim for the 2018–19 season. After two seasons with Union Berlin, Andrich moved to fellow Bundesliga side Bayer Leverkusen signing a five-year-contract until 2026.

References

External links
 

Living people
1994 births
Sportspeople from Potsdam
German footballers
Footballers from Brandenburg
Association football midfielders
Bundesliga players
2. Bundesliga players
3. Liga players
Hertha BSC players
Hertha BSC II players
Dynamo Dresden players
SV Wehen Wiesbaden players
1. FC Heidenheim players
1. FC Union Berlin players
Bayer 04 Leverkusen players